The Peruvian plantcutter (Phytotoma raimondii) is an endangered species of bird in the family Cotingidae. As the other plantcutters, this species is sexually dimorphic and folivorous. It is endemic to scrub and woodland in north-western Peru, and is threatened by habitat loss.

References

External links
BirdLife Species Factsheet.

Peruvian plantcutter
Endemic birds of Peru
Peruvian plantcutter
Peruvian plantcutter
Taxonomy articles created by Polbot